Denon is a Japanese electronics company.

Denon may also refer to:

 Denon Records, Japanese audiophile record label
 Denon, fictional planet in the Star Wars franchise.
 Kassoum Denon, Malian politician
 Vivant Denon (Dominique Vivant, Baron Denon), French curator, artist and archaeologist, first Director of the Louvre Museum